Doronicum is a genus of flowering plants in the sunflower family, known as leopard's bane. They are all herbaceous perennials native to Europe, southwest Asia and Siberia. They produce yellow, daisy-like flowerheads in spring and summer.

Although the genus is often classified in the tribe Senecioneae, there is evidence that a classification elsewhere in the subfamily Asteroideae may be more appropriate.

 Species

Doronicum bellidiastrum Sm. is a synonym for Bellis sylvestris.

References

External links
 

Senecioneae
Asteraceae genera
Taxa named by Carl Linnaeus